Luminance is a photometric measure of the luminous intensity per unit area of light travelling in a given direction. It describes the amount of light that passes through, is emitted from, or is reflected from a particular area, and falls within a given solid angle. 

Brightness is the term for the subjective impression of the objective luminance measurement standard (see  for the importance of this contrast).

The SI unit for luminance is candela per square metre (cd/m2). A non-SI term for the same unit is the nit. The unit in the Centimetre–gram–second system of units (CGS) (which predated the SI system) is the stilb, which is equal to one candela per square centimetre or 10 kcd/m2.

Description
Luminance is often used to characterize emission or reflection from flat, diffuse surfaces. Luminance levels indicate how much luminous power could be detected by the human eye looking at a particular surface from a particular angle of view. Luminance is thus an indicator of how bright the surface will appear. In this case, the solid angle of interest is the solid angle subtended by the eye's pupil. 

Luminance is used in the video industry to characterize the brightness of displays.

Luminance is invariant in geometric optics. This means that for an ideal optical system, the luminance at the output is the same as the input luminance. 

For real, passive optical systems, the output luminance is at most equal to the input. As an example, if one uses a lens to form an image that is smaller than the source object, the luminous power is concentrated into a smaller area, meaning that the illuminance is higher at the image. The light at the image plane, however, fills a larger solid angle so the luminance comes out to be the same assuming there is no loss at the lens. The image can never be "brighter" than the source.

Health effects

Retinal damage can occur when the eye is exposed to high luminance. Damage can occur because of local heating of the retina. Photochemical effects can also cause damage, especially at short wavelengths.

Luminance meter
A luminance meter is a device used in photometry that can measure the luminance in a particular direction and with a particular solid angle. The simplest devices measure the luminance in a single direction while imaging luminance meters measure luminance in a way similar to the way a digital camera records color images.

Mathematical definition 

The luminance of a specified point of a light source, in a specified direction, is defined by the derivative

where
 v is the luminance (cd/m2),
 d2v is the luminous flux (lm) leaving the area d in any direction contained inside the solid angle dΣ,
 d is an infinitesimal area (m2) of the source containing the specified point,
 dΣ is an infinitesimal solid angle (sr) containing the specified direction,
 Σ is the angle between the normal nΣ to the surface d and the specified direction.

If light travels through a lossless medium, the luminance does not change along a given light ray. As the ray crosses an arbitrary surface S, the luminance is given by

where
 d is the infinitesimal area of S seen from the source inside the solid angle dΣ,
 dS is the infinitesimal solid angle subtended by d as seen from d,
 S is the angle between the normal nS to d and the direction of the light.

More generally, the luminance along a light ray can be defined as

where
 d is the etendue of an infinitesimally narrow beam containing the specified ray,
 dv is the luminous flux carried by this beam,
  is the index of refraction of the medium.

Relation to illuminance

The luminance of a reflecting surface is related to the illuminance it receives:

where the integral covers all the directions of emission ,
 v is the surface's luminous exitance,
 v is the received illuminance,
  is the reflectance.

In the case of a perfectly diffuse reflector (also called a Lambertian reflector), the luminance is isotropic, per Lambert's cosine law. Then the relationship is simply

Units
A variety of units have been used for luminance, besides the candela per square metre.

See also
Relative luminance
Orders of magnitude (luminance)
Diffuse reflection
Etendue

Lambertian reflectance
Lightness (color)
Luma, the representation of luminance in a video monitor
Lumen (unit)
Radiance, radiometric quantity analogous to luminance
Brightness, the subjective impression of luminance
Glare (vision)

Table of SI light-related units

References

External links 
 A Kodak guide to Estimating Luminance and Illuminance using a camera's exposure meter. Also available in PDF form.
 Autodesk Design Academy Measuring Light Levels

Photometry
Physical quantities